Craley is an unincorporated community within the township of Lower Windsor, in York County, Pennsylvania, United States. Craley is located on Pennsylvania Route 624 2 miles south of East Prospect.

References

Unincorporated communities in York County, Pennsylvania
Unincorporated communities in Pennsylvania